The Secret Goldfish are a band from Glasgow, Scotland. The group was formed by ex-Fizzbombs singer Katy McCullars, guitarist John Morose, and the rhythm section from The Mackenzies, Graham Lironi and Paul Turnbull.

History
The band took their name from an imaginary book mentioned in the novel The Catcher in the Rye. They released three albums and several singles in the 1990s, on the Glasgow-based Creeping Bent record label. Their first album, 1996's Aqua Pet...You Make Me, was produced by Stephen Lironi. Their sound has been described as "sounding much like The Jesus and Mary Chain locked in a public toilet with Jefferson Airplane and The New York Dolls". An album of B-sides and outtakes, Jet Streams, was released in 1997, and in 1999 they issued the Somewhere in the World EP, the lead track of which was co-written by Vic Godard and featured Francis MacDonald and Stevie Jackson. A second album, Mink Riots followed in 1999. After a lengthy hiatus, The Secret Goldfish returned to live performance in 2016 with a second guitarist (former Orange Juice guitarist James Kirk), with a third album (Petal Split) being released on Creeping Bent in April 2017.

Final line-up:
 Katy McCullars: vocals
 John Morose: guitar
 Steven McSeveney: bass
 Paul Turnbull: drums

Releases

Albums
Aqua Pet... You Make Me (BENT 012) (1996)
Jet Streams (MACD 44712) (April 1997)
Mink Riots (BENT 044) (1999)

E.P.'s and singles
"Seasick" (BENT004) (1995)
"Come Undone" (BENT008) (1996)
Dandelion Milk Summer e.k.o.k. e.p. (BENT016) (1996)
Venus Bonding E.P. (BENT018) (1996)
"Tartan Envy" (BENT020) (1997)
"Give Him a Great Big Kiss" (BENT024) (1997) (split single with Policecat)
"Punk Drone" (BENT032) (1998) (split single with Scientific Support Dept.)
"Somewhere In China" (ER-193) (1998)
Somewhere in the World E.P. (November 1998)
"You're Funny 'Bout That Aren't You" (BENT042) (1999) (split single with Nectarine No. 9)
"4 Excited People" (BENT048) (1999) (split single with Vic Godard)

Album track listings

Aqua Pet... You Make Me
"Come Undone" (3:01)
"Tartan Envy" (3:09)
"The Boy Who Left Home To Learn Fear" (5:52)
"Pet Thang" (1:56)
"Dandelion Milk Summer" (3:43)
"Venus Bonding : Erotic Mars" (2:08)
"I Will See You Through" (4:52)
"I Left One Out, Where Did It Go" (2:23)
"Seasick" (2:51)
"Glass Mountain" (2:09)
"The Catalyst" (2:20)
"Strawberry St." (2:35)
"Another Short Song About Love And Loss" (2:35)
"Bandovian Curve" (2:43)

Produced by Stephen Lironi & engineered by Larry Primrose, except "The Catalyst" & "I Left One Out, Where Did It Go", produced by The Secret Goldfish & engineered by Johnny Cameron
Mastered by John Davis at Whitfield Street Studios, London
All songs by McCullars / Morose, except "The Catalyst" written by G Lironex

Jet Streams
The album includes covers of The Fire Engines, Shangri-Las, Orange Juice, The Velvet Underground and Nirvana songs.

"This Arsehole's Been Burned Too Many Times Before" (2:42)
"Casanova Killer" (4:40)
"Ambulance" (0:43)
"Give Him A Great Big Kiss" (2:45)
"Wasted In Carluke" (1:53)
"Blue Sky Yesterday" (1:23)
"Sunless" (3:36)
"Tartan Envy (Luv n Haight Version)" (3:23)
"Allegro" (0:42)
"Come as You Are" (3:12)
"Rude Awakening" (3:51)
"Everywhere That You Go" (3:49)
"Pink Drone" (5:07)
"Afterhours/Intuition Told Me" (3:02)

Produced by The Secret Goldfish, except 3, 7  & 12 - produced by Stephen Lironi
Recorded by Johnny Cameron, Paul McGeechan & Larry Primrose
Design - Stefan Kassel
Photography - Colin Dunsmuir
Released on Marina Records

Mink Riots
"You're Funny 'Bout That, Aren't You?" (4:37)
"Somewhere in the World" (3:45)
"Laughing Inside" (6:13)
"Scenecruiser" (4:09)
"Honestly, It Was Nothing" (3:16)
"4 Excited People" (2:41)
"Take My Hand" (2:39)
"Hey! Mr. Fox" (2:48)
"Elevate #2" (3:10)
"Pink Drone" (9:18)

Douglas MacIntyre — producer
Katy McCullars — vocals
John Morose — guitar, vocals (background)
Steven McSeveney - bass, vocals (background)
Paul Turnbull - drums
Stevie Jackson — vocals (background)
Francis MacDonald — organ (hammond), wurlitzer, vocals (background)
Gregor Reid — engineer, mixing, producer, vibraphone, tape manipulation
Paul McGeechan — mastering

Petal Split 	
"O. Pioneers" (3:14)
"Amelia Star" (3:48)
"Phonecall" (2:52)
"X" (3:00)
"Winter Tears # 2" (1:49)
"Outrageous Things" (3:56)
"Good Kissers" (2:49)
"El Capitan Y Mi" (3:01)
"A Different Game" (2:14)
"Ain't That Always The Way" (3:00)

Artwork – Victoria Braithwaite
Bass – Steven McSeveney
Co-producer – David Scott (tracks: 1, 2, 5, 6, 8, 10)
Drums – Paul Turnbull
Guitar, Keyboards, Written By – John Morose
Keyboards – David Scott (tracks: 1, 2, 6, 10)
Lead Vocals, Written By – Katy McCullars
Producer – Douglas MacIntyre (tracks: All)
Written By – David Henderson (tracks: A1), Edwyn Collins (tracks: 10), M. Ashman (tracks: 6), Simon Smeeton (tracks: 1), Vic Godard (tracks: 6)
All tracks written / co-written by McCullars & Morose, except 6 & 10.

References

External links
Everything2 bio
Erasing clouds article on Creeping Bent
Live performance pictures

Scottish rock music groups